Albatross Golf Club is a golf club located 9 km north of central Gothenburg, Sweden. It has hosted the Volvo International Tournament on the Ladies European Tour.

History
The club was admitted to the Swedish Golf Federation in 1974 and the first 18 hole course was inaugurated in 1975.

With global vehicle manufacturer Volvo headquartered in Gothenburg, it was only natural for the up-and-coming club to host the Volvo International Tournament, the first Ladies European Tour event held outside the UK and France, starting in 1980. The club also hosted the Volvo Albatross, Tour Final of the Swedish Golf Tour 1986–1989, with winners such as Magnus Persson, Anders Sørensen and Magnus Sunesson.

Amongst the successful players to represent the club are Ladies European Tour players Helene Koch and Kärstin Ehrnlund and Mats Lanner, European Tour winner and member of the winning Swedish team at the 1991 Dunhill Cup.

Tournaments hosted

Ladies European Tour

Swedish Golf Tour
Volvo Albatross – 1986–1989

Swedish Golf Tour (women)
Bridgestone Ladies Open – 1999
Mercedes-Benz Ladies Open – 2000
Albatross Ladies Open – 2001

See also
List of golf courses in Sweden

References

External links

Golf clubs and courses in Sweden